The China–North Korea–Russia tripoint is the tripoint where the China–Russia border and the North Korea–Russia border intersect.
The tripoint is in the Tumen River about 500 meters upstream from Korea Russia Friendship Bridge and under 2,000 meters from the Russian settlement of Khasan.

Markers
Three granite shoreside markers are specified in the 1985 treaty defining the tripoint, which is "a straight line running along the perpendicular from border sign No. 423 on the Russian-Chinese state border to the line of the middle of the main channel of the Tumannaya River between both banks of the river."
Boundary marker no. 423, Russia–China border (treaty number 1; left bank) -  (Pyongyang datum)   (WGS-84) 
Korea marker (treaty number 2; right bank) - 
Russia marker (treaty number 3; left bank) - coordinates to be amended

Description
The terrestrial boundary between Russia and North Korea runs along the fairway (thalweg) of the Tumen River and its estuary, while the maritime boundary separates the two countries' territorial waters in the Sea of Japan.

The principal border treaty was signed on April 17, 1985. A separate, trilateral treaty specifies the position of the tripoint of the borders of Russia, North Korea, and China. The North Korea–Russia and China–North Korea borders run along the middle of the Tumen River, while the China–Russia border approaches the junction point overland from the north. Because the theoretical tripoint is in the middle of the river, where it would be impractical to install a border monument, the agreement provides instead that the three countries install border monuments on the riverbank, and that the position of the tripoint be determined with respect to those monuments.

The administrative unit on the Russian side of the border is the Khasansky District of Primorsky Krai; on the Korean side, it is the city of Rason; on the Chinese side is Fangchuan. The main Russian border guard station in the area is Peschanaya.

Border line versus border zone
Interpretation of various treaties may mean that a China–North Korea border zone exists in the river (or even an international condominium). In this case, the tripoint would not strictly be a point where the three countries' sovereign territory meets.

References

Sources

Further reading

 at PRC Ministry of Foreign Affairs
, item China-Korea (North)-Russia tripoint

Border tripoints
Tripoint
Tripoint
Tripoint
China–Soviet Union border